Suillia plumata is a North American species of fly in the family Heleomyzidae.

References

Heleomyzidae
Insects described in 1862
Taxa named by Hermann Loew